Yucaipa (Serrano: Yukaipa't) is a city located  east of San Bernardino, in San Bernardino County, California, United States. The population was 51,367 at the 2010 census, up from 41,207 at the 2000 census. According to San Bernardino County, the population in 2019 is 53,921.

Yucaipa has the distinction of being the longtime home to a large population of Serrano Native Americans.

History 

Prior to the Spanish colonization of the Americas and the arrival of European settlers from Mexico, the Yucaipa Valley was known as Yukaipa't, which meant "green valley" in the Serrano American Language. The land was home to the Serrano Native Americans for thousands of years. Today, some of their descendants are enrolled in the San Manuel Band of Mission Indians.

Yucaipa Rancheria
Yucaipa Valley supported a large population of Serrano Native Americans.  The fertile valley was watered by springs and creeks running out of the San Bernardino Mountains.  The Serrano Americans lived in this location most of the year, but would make excursions into the mountains to gather acorns and other food items during their harvest season. The Rancheria is marked by California Historical Landmark #620.

Yucaipa Adobe

Near the Rancheria is the Yucaipa Adobe, which is believed to be the oldest house in San Bernardino County. Diego Sepúlveda, nephew of Antonio María Lugo, built the Adobe in 1842 on land that was part of the Rancho San Bernardino granted in 1842 to the Lugos. It had formerly been land controlled by San Gabriel Mission.  The Rancho suffered losses of cattle and horses from raids by Native Americans coming through Cajon Pass and Banning Pass from the deserts.  Eventually, they sold the Rancho to Mormon settlers in September 1851.  The Adobe's later owners included John Brown Sr., James W. Waters, and the Dunlap family; it was acquired by San Bernardino County in 1955.  The site is marked by California Historical Landmark #528.

The nearby Oak Glen area is best known for its apple orchards, some of which are operated by the direct descendants of the original founders (the Parrish, Wilshire, Rivers, and Law families). The Parrish Pioneer Ranch and orchard were founded by Enoch Parrish in 1876, with the other families coming into the area later.

21st century
At 1:53 p.m. on June 16, 2005, Yucaipa experienced a 4.9 Mw earthquake that was centered four miles (6 km) north of the center of town. It had a maximum Mercalli intensity of VI (Strong) and was felt from downtown Los Angeles to some areas of San Diego. Three people were injured.

In 2016, Yucaipa broke ground on a multipurpose performing arts center on the corner of Acacia Avenue and California Street. The performing arts center officially opened in Spring 2019.

Geography

Parks
Yucaipa is home to Yucaipa Regional Park, Flag Hill Veterans Memorial Park, Seventh Street Park, "I" Street Park, and Wildwood Park.  Recently added was the Yucaipa Community Park, the Bryant Glen Sports Complex, the Rick McCowan Regional Soccer Complex, as well as the newly established Wildwood Canyon State Park.

Climate
According to the Köppen Climate Classification system, Yucaipa has a Mediterranean climate, abbreviated Csa on climate maps.

Demographics

2010
At the 2010 census Yucaipa had a population of 51,367. The racial makeup of Yucaipa was 40,824 (79.5%) White (65.9% Non-Hispanic White), 837 (1.6%) African American, 485 (0.9%) Native American, 1,431 (2.8%) Asian, 74 (0.1%) Pacific Islander, 5,589 (10.9%) from other races, and 2,127 (4.1%) from two or more races. Hispanic or Latino of any race were 13,943 persons (27.1%).

The census reported that 50,813 people (98.9% of the population) lived in households, 227 (0.4%) lived in non-institutionalized group quarters, and 327 (0.6%) were institutionalized.

There were 18,231 households, 6,996 (38.4%) had children under the age of 18 living in them, 9,842 (54.0%) were opposite-sex married couples living together, 2,231 (12.2%) had a female householder with no husband present, 1,026 (5.6%) had a male householder with no wife present. There were 1,061 (5.8%) unmarried opposite-sex partnerships, and 114 (0.6%) same-sex married couples or partnerships. 4,198 households (23.0%) were one person and 1,970 (10.8%) had someone living alone who was 65 or older. The average household size was 2.79. There were 13,099 families (71.9% of households); the average family size was 3.29.

The age distribution was 13,444 people (26.2%) under the age of 18, 4,489 people (8.7%) aged 18 to 24, 12,536 people (24.4%) aged 25 to 44, 14,064 people (27.4%) aged 45 to 64, and 6,834 people (13.3%) who were 65 or older. The median age was 37.8 years. For every 100 females, there were 96.8 males. For every 100 females age 18 and over, there were 92.5 males.

There were 19,642 housing units at an average density of 704.2 per square mile, of the occupied units 13,503 (74.1%) were owner-occupied and 4,728 (25.9%) were rented. The homeowner vacancy rate was 3.0%; the rental vacancy rate was 9.0%. 37,165 people (72.4% of the population) lived in owner-occupied housing units and 13,648 people (26.6%) lived in rental housing units.

2000
Since the city incorporated in 1989, it has experienced a significant level of growth. At the 2000 census Yucaipa had 41,207 residents, 15,193 households, and 10,680 families. The population density was 1,483.4 inhabitants per square mile (572.7/km). The racial makeup was 85.2% White, 0.9% African American, 1.1% Native American, 1.2% Asian, 0.1% Pacific Islander, 8.0% from other races, and 3.5% from two or more races. Hispanics or Latinos constitute 18.4%.

Of the 15,193 households 35.4% had children under the age of 18; 54.2% were married couples; 11.6% had a female householder; and 29.7% were non-families. 25.3% of households were one person and 13.4% of those were 65 or older. The average household size was 2.7 and the average family size was 3.2.

The age distribution was 28.5% under the age of 18, 7.6% from 18 to 24, 27.2% from 25 to 44, 21.2% from 45 to 64, and 15.5% 65 or older. The median age was 37 years. For every 100 females, there were 93.5 males. For every 100 females age 18 and over, there were 88.4 males.

The median household income was $39,144 and the median family income  was $48,683. Males had a median income of $40,480 versus $25,957 for females. The per capita income for the city was $18,949. About 8.8% of families and 11.2% of the population were below the poverty line, including 13.2% of those under age 18 and 7.2% of those age 65 or over.

Government

From November 1999, Richard (Dick) D. Riddell was the longest-serving mayor (and the oldest, at age 88) in Yucaipa's history. In November 2012, at the request of newly sworn councilman Bobby Duncan, Denise Hoyt was named the new Mayor. , Yucaipa's City Council was composed of Mayor Greg Bogh, Mayor Pre Tem Bobby Duncan, Councilman David Avila, Councilman Jon Thorp and Councilman Justin Beaver. Beaver was elected to Yucaipa's 4th district as the youngest councilman in the city's history at 32 years of age.

Education
The Yucaipa-Calimesa Joint Unified School District serves both cities, with the following schools:
 Elementary (K–5): Dunlap, Chapman Heights, Calimesa, Ridgeview, Valley, Wildwood, Inland Leaders Charter School, Competitive Edge Charter Academy
 Middle school (6–8): Park View Middle School, Mesa View Middle School (in Calimesa), Competitive Edge Charter Academy, Inland Leaders Charter School
 High school: Yucaipa High School (9-12), Green Valley High School (10-12)

The city is also home to Crafton Hills College, operated by the San Bernardino Community College District.

Public safety
The San Bernardino County Sheriff's Department serves Yucaipa—including the nearby unincorporated towns of Mentone, Oak Glen, Forest Falls, Angelus Oaks, and Mountain Home Village—from its regional station at 34282 Yucaipa Boulevard (a larger replacement opened on July 1, 2014, next to City Hall at 34144 Yucaipa Boulevard). Since there is no official jail facility at this station, suspects are booked at either Central Jail in downtown San Bernardino or the West Valley Detention Center in Rancho Cucamonga.

Yucaipa has contracted operation of its fire department to the California Department of Forestry and Fire Protection (now known as "Cal Fire") which serves the city from three stations: the 33000 block of Yucaipa Boulevard, Bryant Street (in the "North Bench" area), and the southwest corner of Fifth Street and Wildwood Canyon Road. Cal-Fire also provides paramedic level emergency medical service while patient transport by ground is handled by American Medical Response.

Notable people
Susan Anton - Miss California 1969, singer and actress
Matt Carson - professional baseball player
Tyler Chatwood - professional baseball player for the Toronto Blue Jays
Matt Davidson - professional baseball player
Noble Johnson - actor
 Corky Miller - professional baseball player
 Lois Rodden - astrologer, author of Data News
 Mark Teahen - professional baseball player
Taijuan Walker - professional baseball player

California Historical Landmark
Marker at the site reads:
NO. 620 YUCAIPA RANCHERIA - Yucaipa Valley supported a large population of Serrano Indians. The fertile valley was watered by springs and creeks. The Indians called this area 'Yucaipat' which meant 'wet lands.' These Native Americans lived at this village site most of the year, with occasional excursions to the mountains to gather acorns and other food items during the harvesting season.

Marker at the site reads:
NO. 528 YUCAIPA ADOBE - Constructed in 1842 by Diego Sepúlveda, nephew of Antonio María Lugo, this is believed to be the oldest house in San Bernardino County. The land, formerly controlled by San Gabriel Mission, was part of the Rancho San Bernardino granted to the Lugos in 1842. The adobe's later owners included John Brown Sr., James W. Waters, and the Dunlap family, it was acquired by San Bernardino County in 1955.

See also
California Historical Landmarks in San Bernardino County, California
History of San Bernardino, California

References

External links

City of Yucaipa
The website for the Yucaipa-Calimesa Joint Unified School District
The Yucaipa Valley Chamber of Commerce

 
Cities in San Bernardino County, California
Incorporated cities and towns in California
Populated places in San Bernardino County, California
Populated places established in 1989
California Historical Landmarks